Mercer's Hospital was a hospital in Dublin, Ireland. It was converted into a clinical centre and medical library for the Royal College of Surgeons in Ireland in 1991.

History
The hospital has its origins in a leper house and church named St. Stephen's which was established on the site pre-1230 AD and which had come under the jurisdiction of an unnamed religious brotherhood by the late 14th century. Both St Stephen's Green and Stephen Street were named after the site. The charitable offerings of the citizens of Dublin to the institution diminished during the Elizabethan era and an entry in the Assembly Rolls of the Corporation of 1590-91 describes how "the poor lazares (lepers) of St. Stephen's complaineth that they are in distress and wante". By 1665 the old hospital, chapel and graveyard of St. Stephen's lay derelict and the site was walled in. Somewhat of an effort was made between 1697 and 1698 to revive the hospital in some form, and permission was granted by the Churchwardens to "build a house containing four rooms for poor decayed Christians" on ground "adjoining the gate of St. Stephen's Churchyard which is now walled in and made parte of the said churchyard, but on which ground, or thereabouts, there was formerly a poore house built." The house for "poor decayed Christians" was never built and the site lay vacant until February 1724 when Mary Mercer began leasing part of St Stephen's churchyard for the purposes of establishing a charity house thereon.

Mercer began leasing the site from a committee consisting of 'the Minister, Church Wardens and Parishioners of the Parish of St. Peter's, Dublin' with the aim of assisting 'twenty poor girls or other poor persons' there Within a decade she had built a facility to help these people on the site. In May 1734, with the advice, direction & consent of the aforementioned St. Peter's committee, Mercer assigned unto a number of eminent surgeons the running of the facility who subsequently converted it into a hospital for patients suffering from "diseases of tedious and hazardous cure, such as falling-sickness, lunacy, leprosy, and the like". Mary Mercer passed away at her home in Great Ship Street on 4 March 1735, and her decision to hand over the property at this point may have been influenced by ill health or advanced age. To support funding for the fledgling hospital a number of concerts were arranged over the following years. The most significant of these was the first performance of Handel's Messiah, which took place in the Ancient Musick Rooms in Fishamble Street on 13 April 1742. To provide room for a large audience, ladies were requested to lay aside their hoops and gentlemen their swords. By this means an audience of 700 was crowded into the space, and the concert realised £400.

The hospital was completely rebuilt to a design by J.H. Brett in 1884. In the late 19th century Mercer's was one of the chief teaching hospitals in Dublin; it was located close to several schools of medicine, including Kirby's and the Ledwich school (run by Thomas Ledwich) in Peter Street. Ledwich's brother, Edward, became surgeon and lecturer at the hospital. Among other surgeons who practised there in the latter half of the 19th century were Edward Stamer O'Grady.

In the late 1880s trouble broke out among the staff, leading to charges being brought against Dr. O'Grady, senior surgeon at the hospital. In October 1887 he was accused of insulting his professional colleagues to such an extent that they were unable to work with him. He had also charged one of the members of the board with loitering in the female ward for immodest purposes. Some of the staff left. Lectures were disrupted and the numbers of students fell. The row continued into the 1890s until finally he and most of the staff were dismissed by the governors, and he refused to seek re-election. O'Grady died at home on 18 October 1897. A new management team was appointed under the rule of Dr. ("Bull") Elliott in 1898: among them was Sir John Lumsden.

The hospital closed in 1983 and was acquired by the Royal College of Surgeons in Ireland who converted it into a clinical centre and medical library in 1991.

Notable physicians
Among the notable physicians who have been associated with Mercer's Hospital are:
Francis L'Estrange (1756–1836), physician born in County Westmeath who was educated as a surgeon. In 1779 he was appointed Assistant Surgeon to Mercer's Hospital, where he later became surgeon. He was later appointed Assistant Surgeon to the House of Industry Hospitals, and surgeon to the Marine School. He engaged in obstetrical practice and was present at the birth of the poet, Thomas Moore (1779). He became president of the Royal College of Surgeons in Ireland in 1796.
John Lumsden (1869–1944), the Principal Medical Officer for the Commissioners of Irish Lights, Chief Medical Officer at the Guinness Brewery and founder of the St John Ambulance Ireland.
J. B. Lyons (1922–2007), a medical historian, writer, physician and professor of medicine.
Jonathan Osborne (1794–1864), of Cullenswood House, Dublin, appointed physician about 1830.
Robert Rowlette (c 1879–1944), a consultant and an independent Teachta Dála (TD). He was later a member of Seanad Éireann.

At the bi-centennial anniversary of the hospital in 1934 the staff included: Charles B. Maunsell, Seton Pringle, Bethel Solomons, William de Courcy Wheeler and Gibbon Fitzgibbon. House physicians were Dr. Wentworth Taylor and Dr. Muriel Smiddy.

References

Sources

Further reading
J. B. Lyons ((1991) The Quality of Mercer’s: the story of Mercer’s Hospital, 1734-1991 (Dublin: Glendale)
J. B. Lyons, Irish Journal of Medical Science, Springer London,  (Print), Issue Volume 177, Number 2 / June 2008
Royal Irish Academy (2009) The Dictionary of Irish Biography; edited by James McGuire and James Quinn. Dublin
Sonnelitter, Karen (2016). Charity Movements in Eighteenth-Century Ireland: Philanthropy and Improvement. Woodbridge, Suffolk: Boydell & Brewer. 

Hospitals in Dublin (city)
1734 establishments in Ireland
Hospitals established in the 1730s
Defunct hospitals in the Republic of Ireland
 
1983 disestablishments in Ireland
Hospitals disestablished in 1983